The Kreisliga Hessen (English: District league Hesse) was the highest association football league in parts of the German state of Hesse (Rheinhessen) and parts of the Bavarian region of Palatinate as well as the Prussian province of Hesse-Nassau from 1919 to 1923. The league was disbanded with the introduction of the Bezirksliga Rheinhessen-Saar in 1923.

While the league carries the name Kreisliga Hessen it did not cover anywhere near the whole area of what is now the federal state of Hesse. Its main body lay in what is now Rhineland-Palatinate, together with the Wiesbaden area of the state of Hesse.

Overview

Predecessor
From 1907, four regional leagues were formed within the structure of the Southern German football championship, in a move to improve the organisation of football in Southern Germany, these being:
 Ostkreis-Liga, covering Bavaria
 Nordkreis-Liga, covering Hesse
 Südkreis-Liga, covering Württemberg, Baden and Alsace
 Westkreis-Liga, covering the Palatinate, Lorraine and the southern Rhine Province

In 1908, a first Nordkreis-Liga (English: Northern District League) and Westkreis-Liga (English: Western District League) were established. With the outbreak of the First World War, league football came to a halt and, during the war, games were only played on a limited level.

Post-First World War
With the collapse of the German Empire in 1918, no Nord- or Westkreis championship was played in 1918-19 but football returned to a more organised system in 1919.

Southern Germany, now without the Alsace and Lorraine regions, which had to be returned to France, was sub-divided into ten Kreisligas, these being:
 Kreisliga Hessen      
 Kreisliga Nordbayern  
 Kreisliga Nordmain    
 Kreisliga Odenwald    
 Kreisliga Pfalz       
 Kreisliga Saar        
 Kreisliga Südbayern  
 Kreisliga Südmain     
 Kreisliga Südwest     
 Kreisliga Württemberg

The new Kreisliga Hessen was made up from ten clubs from both the Nordkreis and Westkreis leagues. The league winners of the Kreisligas advanced to the Southern championship. This system applied for the 1919-20 and 1920-21 season.

In 1921-22, the Kreisliga Hessen was split into two groups of eight, increasing the number of tier-one clubs in the region to 16. The two league winners then played a final to determine the Hessen champion, which in turn advanced to a Rheinhessen-Saar championship final against the Saar champion. This "watering down" of football in the region lasted for only one season, in 1922-23, the number of top clubs was reduced to eight clubs in a single division, with a Rheinhessen-Saar  final against the Saar champion once more.

In 1923, a league reform which was decided upon in Darmstadt, Hesse, established the Southern German Bezirksligas which were to replace the Kreisligas. The best four teams each from the Kreisliga Hessen and Saar were admitted to the new Bezirksliga Rheinhessen-Saar. The four clubs from Hessen were:
 SV Wiesbaden
 TG Höchst
 Alemannia Worms
 FV 02 Bieberich

National success
The clubs from the Kreisliga Hessen were not particularly successful in this era and none managed to qualify for the German championship.

Rheinhessen-Saar championship
Played in 1922 and 1923, these were the finals:
 1922:
 Hessen final: SV Wiesbaden - Alemannia Worms 2-0 / 1-4 / 2-1
 Rheinhessen-Saar final: Borussia Neunkirchen - SV Wiesbaden 3-1 / 3-0
 1923:
 Rheinhessen-Saar final: Borussia Neunkirchen - SV Wiesbaden 0-0 / 2-2 / 3-0

Southern German championship
Qualified teams and their success:
 1920:
 Germania Wiesbaden, Group stage
 1921:
 FSV Mainz 05, Group stage
 1922:
 SV Wiesbaden, not qualified
 1923:
 SV Wiesbaden, not qualified

Winners and runners-up of the Kreisliga Hessen

Placings in the Kreisliga Hessen 1919-23

 1 VfR Worms joined Wormatia Worms in 1922.

References

Sources
 Fussball-Jahrbuch Deutschland  (8 vol.), Tables and results of the German tier-one leagues 1919-33, publisher: DSFS
 Kicker Almanach,  The yearbook on German football from Bundesliga to Oberliga, since 1937, published by the Kicker Sports Magazine
 Süddeutschlands Fussballgeschichte in Tabellenform 1897-1988  History of Southern German football in tables, publisher & author: Ludolf Hyll

External links
 The Gauligas  Das Deutsche Fussball Archiv 
 German league tables 1892-1933  Hirschi's Fussball seiten
 Germany - Championships 1902-1945 at RSSSF.com

1
1919 establishments in Germany
1923 disestablishments in Germany
Football competitions in Hesse
20th century in Hesse
Southern German football championship
Football competitions in Rhineland-Palatinate
Sports leagues established in 1919
Ger